Phlegra simplex is a jumping spider species in the genus Phlegra that lives in Tanzania and Zimbabwe. The male was first described in 2000.

References

Arthropods of Tanzania
Arthropods of Zimbabwe
Salticidae
Spiders of Africa
Spiders described in 2000
Taxa named by Wanda Wesołowska